Scottie Vines (born April 17, 1979 in Alexander City, Alabama) is an American football player who played wide receiver for the Detroit Lions.  He played college football for the University of Wyoming.

High school years
Vines attended Benjamin Russell High School(Alexander City, Alabama)and was a letterman in football, basketball, and track&field. In basketball, he was named the Regional M.V.P. In track&field, he won the Class 6A State Title on the high jump. Scottie Vines graduated from Benjamin Russell High School in 1998.

As of 2014 he is living back in his home town of Alexander City, Alabama working at Madix Store Fixtures Incorporated in Goodwater, AL as a spot welder.

External links
Scottie Vines bio page

1979 births
Living people
People from Alexander City, Alabama
Players of American football from Alabama
American football wide receivers
Wyoming Cowboys football players
Detroit Lions players
Philadelphia Soul players